Ricky is a 2009 French fantasy film directed by François Ozon about a human baby who develops a set of functional wings, and how the parents cope with the child's abnormality.

Plot 
Katie (Alexandra Lamy) lives with her daughter Lisa (Mélusine Mayance) in welfare housing in eastern Paris. Their family is disrupted when Katie falls in love with Paco (Sergi López), her Spanish co-worker in a cosmetics factory. A baby is born after Paco moves in. The child, who they name Ricky (Arthur Peyret), becomes a source of anxiety and unwelcome surprise as he is noisy and demanding. To make matters worse, Ricky's shoulder blades begin growing wings. The baby also starts to fly. He becomes a public curiosity further throwing the family into disarray and fear for Ricky's safety. Katie and Paco put a rope on Ricky so he won't fly away. They let go of Ricky as Katie is holding the rope and everyone is surprised to see Ricky flying. But when Katie accidentally let go the rope Ricky flies away and though they chase after him, he flies away.  Katie and Paco think Ricky is dead. Katie is despondent and about to commit suicide when she hears Ricky's voice and his flapping wings, as he returns.

Cast
Alexandra Lamy as Katie 
Sergi López as Paco 
Mélusine Mayance as Lisa 
Arthur Peyret as Ricky 
André Wilms as Le médecin hôpital 
Jean-Claude Bolle-Reddat as Le journaliste

References

External links

 Ricky // IFC Films
 Official site

2000s fantasy drama films
2009 films
French fantasy drama films
Films based on short fiction
2000s French-language films
Films directed by François Ozon
2009 drama films
2000s French films